Moshe Solomon is an Israeli politician who serves as a member of Knesset for the Religious Zionist Party following the 2022 Israeli legislative election.

Biography
On 28 July 2022, Solomon announced his candidacy for a slot on the Religious Zionism Party list.

References

Living people
Members of the 25th Knesset (2022–)
Religious Zionist Party politicians
Year of birth missing (living people)